Chang Hui-chien (born 18 September 1969) is a Taiwanese butterfly, freestyle and medley swimmer. She competed at the 1984 Summer Olympics and the 1988 Summer Olympics.

References

External links
 

1969 births
Living people
Taiwanese female butterfly swimmers
Taiwanese female freestyle swimmers
Taiwanese female medley swimmers
Olympic swimmers of Taiwan
Swimmers at the 1984 Summer Olympics
Swimmers at the 1988 Summer Olympics
Place of birth missing (living people)
20th-century Taiwanese women